This article is about the demographic features of the population of Gibraltar, including ethnicity, education level, health of the populace, economic status, religious affiliations and other aspects of the population.

Ethnic origins
One of the main features of Gibraltar's population is the diversity of their ethnic origins. The demographics of Gibraltar reflects Gibraltarians' racial and cultural fusion of the many European and non-European immigrants who came to the Rock over three hundred years. They are the descendants of economic migrants that came to Gibraltar after the majority of the Spanish population left in 1704.

Spanish
The majority of the Spanish population in Gibraltar (about 5000), with few exceptions, left Gibraltar when the Dutch and English took the city in 1704. The few Spaniards who remained in Gibraltar in August 1704 were augmented by others who arrived in the fleet with Prince George of Hesse-Darmstadt, possibly some two hundred in all, mostly Catalans.

Menorcans began migrating to Gibraltar at the beginning of the common British rule in 1713, thanks to the links between both British possessions during the 18th century. Initially, Menorcans came to Gibraltar looking for work in several trades, especially when Gibraltar was rebuilt after the 1783 Grand Siege. Immigration continued even after Menorca (the original English name was "Minorca") was returned to Spain in 1802 by the Treaty of Amiens.

Immigration from Spain (like the exiles from the Spanish Civil War) and intermarriage with Spaniards from the surrounding Spanish towns was a constant feature of Gibraltar's history until the then Spanish dictator, General Francisco Franco, closed the border with Gibraltar in 1969, cutting off many Gibraltarians from their relatives on the Spanish side of the frontier.

Together, Gibraltarians of Spanish origin are one of the bigger groups (more than 24% according to last names, even more taking into account the fact that many Spanish women married native Gibraltarians).

British
Britons have come and settled or gone since the first days of the conquest. One group of Britons have had temporary residence in Gibraltar (to work in the administration and the garrison). This group, who represented a larger proportion in the beginning of the British period, are nowadays only about 3% of the total population (around 1,000 persons).

A larger group is formed by the Britons who moved to Gibraltar and settled down. Some of them, since the beginning, moved to Gibraltar to earn a living as traders and workers. Others moved to Gibraltar on a temporary assignment and then married with local women. Major construction projects, such as the dockyard in the late 1890s and early 20th century brought large numbers of workers from Great Britain.

13% of Gibraltarian residents are from the United Kingdom proper and the electoral roll shows that 27% of Gibraltar's population has British surnames.

Genoese and other Italians
Genoese came during the 18th and 19th centuries, especially from the poorer parts of Liguria, some of them annually following fishing shoals, as repairmen for the British navy, or as successful traders and merchants; many others came during the Napoleonic period to avoid obligatory conscription to the French Army. Genoese formed the larger group of the new population in the 18th century and middle 19th century. Other Italians came from islands like Sardinia and Sicily. Nowadays, people with Genoese/Italian last names represent about 20% of the population.

Portuguese
Portuguese were one of the earliest groups to move to Gibraltar, especially from the Algarve region in the far south of Portugal. Most of them went to work as labourers and some as traders. Their number increased significantly during the 18th century, and again when many Spaniards left their jobs in Gibraltar after General Franco closed the border in 1969. About 10% of last names in Gibraltar have Portuguese origin.

Moroccans
Moroccans have always had a significant presence in Gibraltar. However, the modern community has more recent origins. Moroccans began arriving in Gibraltar soon after the Spanish government imposed the first restrictions on Spanish workers in Gibraltar in 1964. By the end of 1968 there were at least 1,300 Moroccan workers resident in Gibraltar and this more than doubled following the final closure of the frontier with Spain in June 1969.
There is also a significant number of Moroccan Jews in Gibraltar, representing Jews of both Sephardic origin and Arabic speaking Jews of Morocco (although almost no Gibraltarian Jews today speak Arabic as a first language). Most notably the Hassan family which runs Gibraltar's largest law firm Hassans International Law Firm and the late Sir Joshua Hassan who served four terms as Chief Minister for a total of 17 years.

Other groups
Other groups include:
Malta was in the same imperial route to the east as Gibraltar. Maltese people came to Gibraltar when jobs were scarce at home, or to escape the law in Malta.
Jews, most of them of Sephardi origin, were able to re-establish their rites, forbidden in Catholic Spain, right after the British occupation in 1704. Also a significant number of Jews from London settled in Gibraltar, especially since the Great Siege. 
Indians, came as merchants after the opening of the Suez Canal in 1870; many others migrated as workers after the closure of the frontier with Spain in 1969 to replace Spanish ones.
French, many of whom came after the French Revolution in 1789, set up trade and commerce.

National censuses

2012 census 

The composition of the population by nationality at the 2012 census was as follows:

2001 census
The composition of the population by nationality at the 2001 census was as follows:

Population overview 

The population of Gibraltar was 29,752 in 2011.

Vital statistics

1During World War II a large part of the civilian population (including most women) were evacuated.

CIA World Factbook demographic statistics 

The following demographic statistics are from the CIA World Factbook, unless otherwise indicated.

Population age
0-14 years:
17.2% (male 2,460; female 2,343)
15-64 years:
66.3% (male 9,470; female 9,070)
65 years and over:
16.5% (male 2,090; female 2,534) (2007 est.)

Sex ratio
At birth:
1.06 males/female
0-14 years:
1.05 males/female
15-64 years:
1.044 males/female
65 years and over:
0.825 males/female
total population:
1.005 males/female (2007 est.)

The median age is: 
total: 40.3 years
male: 39.8 years
female: 40.7 years (2008 est.)

Life expectancy
total population:
79.93 years
male:
77.05 years
female:
82.96 years (2007 est.)

Fertility
1.95 children born/woman (2007 est.)

Infant mortality
total:
4.98 deaths/1,000 live births
male:
5.54 deaths/1,000 live births 
female:
4.39 deaths/1,000 live births (2007 est.)

Nationality
noun:
Gibraltarian(s)
adjective:
Gibraltar

Religions

Roman Catholic 74.32%, Church of England 4.98%, Other Christian 1.21%, Muslim 2.01%, Jewish 2.12%, Hindu 4.76%, other or unspecified 0.94%, none 2.86% (2001 census)

Languages
English (used in schools and for official purposes), Spanish. Most Gibraltarians converse in Llanito, an Andalusian Spanish based vernacular. It consists of an eclectic mix of Andalusian Spanish and British English as well as languages such as Maltese, Portuguese, Italian of the Genoese variety and Haketia. Among more educated Gibraltarians, it also typically involves code-switching to English. Arabic is spoken by the Moroccan community, just like Hindi and Sindhi is spoken by the Indian community of Gibraltar. Maltese is still spoken by some families of Maltese descent.

Literacy
definition:
NA
total population:
above 80%
male:
NA%
female:
NA%

Educational attainment in Gibraltar

Crime rate

A total of 2,093 criminal offences were recorded in Gibraltar during 2005/2006.
Indians had a significantly lower crime rate in 2005/2006 than all other national origins in Gibraltar at 1.69 crimes per 100 Indian people. The crimes per 100 population in Gibraltar now stands at 6.3. The crime rate for Gibraltarians and Moroccans has risen from 6.1 and 9.36 per 100 people in 2004/2005 to its current levels.

Notes

References
Government of Gibraltar website

See also